Ivan Javorčić (born 24 January 1979) is a Croatian football manager and a former player, most recently in charge as head coach of Italian Serie B club Venezia.

Playing career
Born in Split, Javorčić began playing football for the youth side of local club RNK Split. He first played for the senior team at age 15.

Javorčić spent most of his career in Italy, where he moved in 1996 to sign a four-year contract with Serie B club Brescia. After he played for one season in Serie A and two seasons in Serie B for the club, Javorčić went out on loans to Serie B club Crotone and Serie C1 club Treviso during 2001. He joined Serie A club Atalanta in 2002, but did not play for the first team. Next he transferred to second division Arezzo, but suffered a career-threatening knee injury in May 2004 that kept him off the field for more than two years. He returned from injury in October 2006, playing for Pizzighettone in Serie C1.

Coaching career
After his retirement from active footballing, Javorčić returned  at his former club Brescia as a youth coach.

On 15 December 2014, after the dismissal of head coach Ivo Iaconi, it was announced Javorčić would take charge of the first team on an interim basis. He was allowed to guide Brescia only for a short period due to him not having the required coaching badges.

During his short tenure as a coach, he managed to guide Brescia to a slight improvement in results despite a troubled financial situation, and ended his caretaking spell on 21 January 2015 with a 3–1 home win against high-flying Frosinone before to hand over coaching duties to Salvatore Giunta.

He then served as head coach of Lega Pro club Mantova from October 2015 to March 2016. In April 2017, he was named new head coach of Serie D club Pro Patria. They advanced to third-tier Serie C at the end of the 2017–18 season, with Javorčić guiding them for the following three seasons in the league.

On 8 June 2021, Pro Patria announced Javorčić's departure from the club. On 14 June 2021, he was unveiled as the new head coach of fellow Serie C club Südtirol on a two-year contract. On his first season in charge, Javorčić guided Südtirol to triumph in the Group A of the 2021–22 Serie C, achieving promotion to Serie B for the first time in the club's history; in addition to that, he led Südtirol to make it all the way to the 2021–22 Coppa Italia Serie C finals, lost on aggregate to fellow Group A club Padova.

On 9 June 2022, Javorčić was unveiled as the new head coach of recently-relegated Serie B club Venezia, signing a three-year deal with the Lagunari. His Venezia experience turned out to be short-lived, as he was relieved from his duties on 31 October 2022 due to negative results, leaving the team down in the relegation zone of the 2022–23 Serie B league.

Managerial statistics

Honours

Player
Arezzo
 Serie C1: 2003–04 (Group A)
 Supercoppa di Serie C: 2004

Coach
Pro Patria
 Serie D: 2017–18 (Group B)
 Scudetto Dilettanti: 2017–18
Südtirol
 Serie C: 2021–22 (Group A)

References

External links
 

1979 births
Living people
Association football midfielders
Croatian footballers
RNK Split players
Brescia Calcio players
NK Mosor players
F.C. Crotone players
Treviso F.B.C. 1993 players
Atalanta B.C. players
S.S. Arezzo players
A.S. Pizzighettone players
Serie A players
Serie B players
Serie C players
Croatian expatriate footballers
Croatian expatriate sportspeople in Italy
Expatriate footballers in Italy
Aurora Pro Patria 1919 managers
Croatian football managers
Brescia Calcio managers
Mantova 1911 managers
F.C. Südtirol managers
Venezia F.C. managers
Serie C managers
Croatian expatriate football managers
Expatriate football managers in Italy
Footballers from Split, Croatia